The Chechen diaspora is a term used to collectively describe the communities of Chechen people who live outside of Chechnya; this includes Chechens who live in other parts of Russia. There are also significant Chechen populations in other subdivisions of Russia (especially in Dagestan, Ingushetia and Moscow Oblast). 

Outside Russia, Chechens are mainly descendants of people who had to leave Chechnya during the 19th century Caucasian War (which led to the annexation of Chechnya by the Russian Empire) and the 1944 Stalinist deportation to the Soviet Central Asia in the case of Kazakhstan. More recently, tens of thousands of Chechen refugees settled in the European Union and elsewhere as the result of the First and Second Chechen Wars, especially in the wave of emigration to the West after 2002. 

The Chechen diaspora abroad is rather well integrated into the host countries, while keeping their cultures and traditions of origin, despite the difficulties of learning the language of the host country for many nationals.  The Chechens abroad have a reputation of being a rather discreet diaspora, however it suffers from prejudices and negative stereotypes towards them, the Chechens are generally seen as being physically violent people (with an intensive practice of combats sport , such as wrestling, boxing and MMA), having a clannish and tribal culture, medieval mores, and being fundamentalist Muslims or even radical Islamists.

Geography

Statistics by country

See also
Chechen refugees
Chechen Americans

References

External links
Refugees and Diaspora (Chechnya Advocacy Network)

 
European diasporas